The Guru Granth Sahib, a Sikh religious text, promotes a moral teaching that Guru Sahib explains is about living a life of Truth, believe in one God (creator of universe), respect for others, and high moral standards. Followers of the Guru are considered to be members of the Sikh religion, and they are known as Gurmukh – which stands for the “follower of Guru”.

Qualities promoted

All people of the world are equal
The Guru Granth Sahib promotes the message of equality of all beings and at the same time state that Sikh believers "obtain the supreme status" (SGGS, Page 446). Discrimination of all types is strictly forbidden based on the Sikh tenet Fatherhood of God which states that no one should be reckoned low or high, stating that instead believers should –“reckon the entire mankind as One” (Akal Ustat, 15.85).

Sri Guru Granth Sahib promotes the concept of equality by highlighting the fact that we are made of the same flesh, blood and bone and we have the same light of God with us – Soul . Our building bricks are the same:

The Gurus also encourage believers to promote social equality by sharing earnings with those in need.

Women's Status 

Guru Nanak Dev Ji said "Sikhi does not teach you to raise your hand on a woman it teaches you to respect them"

Sikhism also preaches that equal respect should be given to women.

Metaphysic 

Sikhism is strictly  monotheistic in its belief.  This means that God is believed to be the one and sole Reality in the cosmos, meaning that no other being have extra-human power. Sikh Gurus state that God alone is worthy of worship, and the highest end of existence, that is mukti or liberation can come through Devotion to God alone.

Besides its monotheism, Sikhism also emphasizes another philosophical idea, which is known as monism, a philosophical position which argues that the variety of existing things can be explained in terms of a single reality or substance. Furthermore one of the tenet of the religion is the belief that the world is only a "vision" or illusion (Maya) and that God is the sole "Continuing Reality" so that selfishness, egoism and hate are meaningless.

Speak and live truthfully 
Sikhs believe in the importance of truthful living, which can only be created by purity of mind and not through religious purification rites.  They believe that impurity of mind leads to many other vices such as anger, lust, attachment, ego, and greed.

Control the five vices 

Devotees of Guru Sahib believe they must control the animal instincts of Pride/Ego, Anger/Temper, Greed/Urges, Attachment/Dependency and Lust/Addiction.

Live in God's hukam 
A Sikh believes they should live and accept the command of God easily and without too much emotional distress. They attempt to live in contentment and in Chardikala (positive attitude).

Virtues 
The Sikh religion emphasizes several other virtues: Truth (Sat), contentment (santokh), Love (Ishq), Compassion/Mercy (daya), Service (seva), Charity (dana), forgiveness (ksama), humility (nimrata), patience (dheerjh), non-attachment (vairagya) and renunciation (taiga).

These believers attempt to avoid anger (krodh), egoism (ahankara), avarice (lobh), lust (kama), infatuation (moha), sinful acts (papa), pride (man), doubt (duvidha), ownership (mamata), hatred (vair), and hostility (virodh). In the Sikh religion, freedom from these vices, or Sahaj, is attained through tension-free, ethical living, grounded in spirituality avoiding self-mortification and other religious rites of cleansing.

––

References

External links 
 Manuscripts of Guru Granth Sahib

Guru Granth Sahib